"Somewhere Down the Road" is a popular song written by Cynthia Weil and Tom Snow and most famously recorded in 1981 by Barry Manilow. Weil wrote the song's lyrics and Snow wrote the melody.

Release
The song was chosen for Barry Manilow by Arista Records' then-president, Clive Davis, and recorded by Manilow on his album If I Should Love Again. Released as the follow-up to the top 20 hit "The Old Songs", "Somewhere Down the Road" did moderately well as a single in early 1982, reaching #21 on the Billboard Hot 100. On February 20, 1982, the record reached #1 on Billboard's Adult Contemporary chart and stayed there for two weeks.  In Canada, the song reached number seven on the Adult Contemporary chart.

Record World called it a "warm ballad" in which "Manilow's reassuring vocal is complemented with sparkling piano leads."

Popularity
The song was introduced to new audiences when it was prominently featured in an episode of the popular TV show Ally McBeal in 2001. In the episode "Reach Out and Touch" (which guest-starred Manilow as the subject of the title character's hallucinations), the song was performed by Manilow and singer/series regular Vonda Shepard.

In 1996, the song was also introduced to its episode of Philippine drama Villa Quintana on GMA Network as the first season ending in their wedding suicide for Isagani (Keempee de Leon) and Lynette (Donna Cruz).

Charts

Nina version
In 2007, the song was recorded and released by Filipina pop/R&B singer Nina for the repackaged version of her self-titled album entitled Nina Featuring the Hits of Barry Manilow. It was the
carrier single of the album, with a music video of her singing in a studio. The single peaked at #2 in her home country.

Other cover versions
Daniel Evans, a finalist on series 5 of the X Factor (UK) recorded an acoustic piano version on his debut album No Easy Way in 2010.
Roselle Nava
Sabrina
Martin Nievera
Kathy Mattea

See also
List of number-one adult contemporary singles of 1982 (U.S.)

References

1981 songs
1981 singles
1982 singles
Barry Manilow songs
Arista Records singles
Songs written by Tom Snow
Songs with lyrics by Cynthia Weil